Robert Wolter Mongisidi (Manado, February 14, 1925 – Makassar, September 5, 1949) was part of  Indonesia's struggle for independence from the Dutch in South Sulawesi.

Biography
Robert was born in Malalayang (now part of Manado) and was the son of Petrus Mongisidi and Lina Suawa. He started his education in 1931 in elementary school, which was followed by middle school at Frater Don Bosco in Manado. Mongisidi was then educated as a Japanese language teacher at a school in Tomohon. After his studies, he taught Japanese in Liwutung, in the Minahasa region, and in Luwuk, Central Sulawesi, before making his way to Makassar, South Sulawesi.

Indonesia's independence was proclaimed while Mongisidi was in Makassar. However, the Dutch sought to regain control of Indonesia after the end of World War II. They returned through the Netherlands Indies Civil Administration (NICA). Mongisidi became involved in the struggle against NICA in Makassar. On July 17, 1946, Mongisidi with Ranggong Daeng Romo and others formed the Indonesian people's resistance army in Sulawesi, which continually harassed and attacked Dutch positions. He was caught by the Dutch on February 28, 1947, but managed to escape on October 27, 1947. The Dutch caught him again and this time sentenced him to death. Mongisidi was executed by firing squad on September 5, 1949. His body was moved to the Makassar heroes cemetery on November 10, 1950.

Honors
Robert Wolter Mongisidi was posthumously named a national hero by the government of Indonesia on November 6, 1973. He also received the country's highest honor, the Bintang Mahaputra (Adipradana), on November 10, 1973. His then 80-year-old father, Petrus, accepted the honor. The airport in Kendari, South East Sulawesi was formerly named in honor of Mongisidi (it is now named Haluoleo Airport). The Indonesian naval ship KRI Wolter Mongisidi was also named on behalf Mongisidi.

References

1925 births
1949 deaths
People from Manado
Indonesian Christians
Minahasa people
Executed Indonesian people
National Heroes of Indonesia